Taru Rinne (born 27 August 1968 in Turku) is a Finnish former professional motorcycle racer. She was the first woman to achieve points in Grand Prix motorcycle racing.

Career

Karting
Rinne started her racing career in karting, competing against future Formula One drivers Mika Häkkinen, Mika Salo and Jyrki Järvilehto on multiple occasions. She won the Finnish Karting Championship in the 85cc class in 1979, ahead of Häkkinen. In 1980, she finished second behind Salo and ahead of Häkkinen who was fourth. She battled with Häkkinen again in 1981, and this time finished second in the series with Häkkinen becoming the champion. The next year Rinne won the series again and Häkkinen had to settle with second place. In 1983, she also finished first in the championship but was disqualified from the last race due to illegal fuel. Thus the title went to Häkkinen. She was also given a personal one-year ban from racing, which eventually ended her promising career in karting.

Road Racing
Despite her success on four wheels, Rinne decided to switch to motorcycles and debuted in the Road Racing World Championship, now known as MotoGP, in 1988. With her Honda bike she qualified second for the 125cc class GP at Hockenheim in 1989 and managed to lead the race for a while. She eventually finished seventh bettering her earlier eighth place at Assen. This was to remain her best ever result, as she got into a bad accident at Paul Ricard. While recovering from the accident, she got a letter from Bernie Ecclestone, who at the time decided which riders are allowed to compete in the series. The letter said that she is not qualified to compete next season. This ended her career at top-level and Rinne later said that the letter was the biggest disappointment of her life.

Motorcycle Grand Prix Results
Points system from 1969 to 1987:

Points system from 1988 to 1992:

(key) (Races in bold indicate pole position; races in italics indicate fastest lap)

References

External links
 Photographs of Taru Rinne

1968 births
Sportspeople from Turku
Finnish sportswomen
Finnish motorcycle racers
Living people
125cc World Championship riders
Female motorcycle racers